Game Party is a video game developed by FarSight Studios and published by Midway Games. Game Party was retailed as a budget title for the Wii. It is the first game in the Game Party series. It was released on November 27, 2007, in North America; on February 14, 2008, in Australia; and in Europe on February 15, 2008.

Development
In 2006, Midway Games teamed up with FarSight Studios to create a minigame collection only for the Wii. So in early 2007 Midway announced its fall lineup for Nintendo consoles. Later Midway released new information and screenshots. Before the game's release, Midway announced that Game Party was going to be a budget title. The game was released, yet experienced some manufacturing difficulties.

Gameplay

Game Party features a collection of classic skill games from around the world, from American sports venues to European gathering spots. Using the Wii's unique control interface, the player can compete in classic games such as darts, modern favorites such as air hockey and hoop shoot, or participate in multiplayer trivia contests. More than a half dozen games are available. The player can earn tickets to unlock new minigames, characters, tables, etc.

Sequels
Game Party 2 was announced on April 18, 2008, at Midway's Gamer Day event in Las Vegas. The game was released on October 6, 2008. In Europe and Australia it was known as More Game Party. In their 10-K filing, Midway announced Game Party 3 was developed and released on October 6, 2009.

Game Party: In Motion
Game Party Champions

Reception 
Game Party received vehemently negative reviews from critics, some of whom listed it as one of the worst games of all time, with a Metacritic score of 25 out of 100. IGN said that this game started the wave of "shovelware" on the Wii, criticizing the graphics and the mini-games.

Many places gave this game a 1 out of 10: Eurogamer criticized the graphics and the fun factor of the game, saying "The Game Party experience is like going to a party where there's nothing to drink but Tesco Value brandy and there are only four other guests and they're all racist and then your ex turns up and gets off with a Danish supermodel." AceGamez criticized the controls and said that the game is trying to simulate the fun of games like WarioWare: Smooth Moves, unsuccessfully.

Sales
The first Game Party received a "Platinum" sales award from the Entertainment and Leisure Software Publishers Association (ELSPA), indicating sales of at least 300,000 copies in the United Kingdom.

On February 12, 2009, Midway Games announced the Game Party series had sold over 3 million units.

References

2007 video games
FarSight Studios games
Midway video games
Party video games
Video games developed in the United States
Wii-only games
Wii games
Multiplayer and single-player video games